Ylike is a small village 10 miles outside of Porvoo city in Finland.

References

Porvoo
Villages in Finland